Claudia Massari (born 16 January 1966) is a German former figure skater. She competed in the pairs event at the 1984 Winter Olympics.

References

1966 births
Living people
German female pair skaters
Olympic figure skaters of West Germany
Figure skaters at the 1984 Winter Olympics
Sportspeople from Garmisch-Partenkirchen